The Battle of Serobeti took place on June 26, 1892 and was fought between Italy and Mahdist Sudan. The incident took place when one-thousand Mahdist warriors entered Italian Eritrea and were driven back by an Italian-led force of 120 ascari and 200 Baria tribe warriors. In all, Italian losses were three dead and ten wounded, while the Mahdists suffered around one-hundred killed and wounded. Author Sean McLachlan blames the Mahdists' "inferior weaponry and fire discipline" for their defeat at Serobeti and the preceding First Battle of Agordat (1890).

References

1892 in Sudan
1892 in the Italian Empire
Serobeti
Serobeti
Serobeti
Conflicts in 1892
Military history of Eritrea
June 1892 events
Italian Eritrea